The Swiss motorcycle Grand Prix was a motorcycling event that was part of the Grand Prix motorcycle racing season from 1949 to 1954.

Official names and sponsors
1949, 1951: Großer Preis der Schweiz für Motorräder un Seitenwagen (no official sponsor)
1950: G.d Prix Suisse (no official sponsor)
1952: Grosser Preis der Schweiz für Automobile, Motorräder un Seitenwagen (no official sponsor)
1953: Großer Preis der Schweiz für Automobile, Motorräder un Seitenwagen (no official sponsor)
1954: Grand Prix Bern (no official sponsor)

Winners of the Swiss motorcycle Grand Prix

Multiple winners (riders)

Multiple winners (manufacturers)

By year
A pink background indicates an event that was not part of the Grand Prix motorcycle racing championship.

References

 

 
Recurring sporting events established in 1922
Recurring sporting events disestablished in 1954
1922 establishments in Switzerland
1954 disestablishments in Europe